KREV-LP (104.7 FM) is a radio station broadcasting a [community] music format, broadcasting programs for the 40+ audience: Easy Listening, Light Rock, 1950s, Classical, Jazz/Big Band, and Old-Time radio shows. Sunday morning (6am – noon) is reserved for religious programming. Local information about the town and Rocky Mountain National Park is provided throughout the day and in Community Bulletin Board segment at 8am. Beginning the first Sunday in Advent, the station plays all holiday music until January 2. Licensed to Estes Park, Colorado, United States.  The station is currently owned by United Methodist Church of Estes Park.

References

External links
 

REV-LP
REV-LP
Estes Park, Colorado
Community radio stations in the United States